The Tenang state by-election was a state by-election that was held on 30 January 2011 in the state of Johor, Malaysia.  The nomination of candidates was done on 22 January 2011.  The Tenang parliamentary seat fell vacant when its state assemblyman Datuk Sulaiman Taha of United Malays National Organisation died due to a blood infection and other complications due to diabetes. Previously Sulaiman won the Tenang seat with a 2,492-vote majority, beating PAS' Mohd Saim Siran at the 2008 Malaysian general elections. The state assembly seat has some 14,511 voters consisting of 48.9% Malays, 38.3% Chinese, 12% Indians and 0.9% other races. PAS has picked as its candidate Normala Sudirman, a school teacher,  while Barisan Nasional has picked Mohd Azahar.

Results

References

2011
2011 elections in Malaysia
Elections in Johor